Following is a list of destinations Air Namibia flew to as part of its scheduled services prior to its shutdown, . Destinations previously served by the carrier are also listed.

List

See also 
Transport in Namibia

Notes

References

External links

Lists of airline destinations
Defunct airlines of Namibia
Namibia transport-related lists